Bradley Rock is an isolated rock which lies about  northwest of the entrance to French Passage in the Wilhelm Archipelago. It was named by the UK Antarctic Place-Names Committee (1973) for Lieutenant Commander Edgar M. Bradley, Royal Navy, who directed a hydrographic survey in the area in 1965.

References 

Rock formations of the Wilhelm Archipelago